Turris kaffraria is an extinct species of sea snail, a marine gastropod mollusk in the family Turridae, the turrids.

Owing to its columellar folds, the authors Steffen Kiel and Klaus Bandel  state that it certainly does not belong in Turris.

Description

Distribution
Fossils of this marine species were found in Cretaceous strata in Cameroon (age range: 89.3 to 85.8 Ma)

References

 Woods, H., 1906. The Cretaceous fauna of Pondoland. Ann. SA Mus. 4, 275–350.
 L. Riedel. 1933. Die Oberkreide vom Mungofluß in Kamerun und ihre Fauna. Beiträge zur Geologischen Erforschung der Deutschen Schutzgebiete 16:1-154

kaffraria
Gastropods described in 1906